George Nathaniel "Hully" Gee (June 28, 1922 – January 14, 1972) was a Canadian ice hockey player who played for the Chicago Black Hawks and Detroit Red Wings of the National Hockey League between 1945 and 1954. He won the Stanley Cup with Detroit in 1950.

Playing career
Gee began his NHL career with the Chicago Black Hawks in 1945–46. He played in Chicago until 1948 when he was traded four games into the season to the Detroit Red Wings. Gee's name was engraved on the Stanley Cup with Detroit in 1950. After three seasons in Detroit, he rejoined the Hawks for the start of the 1951–52 season and remained there until the end of his NHL career in 1954.

Post-playing career
Gee died in 1972 while playing for the Detroit Red Wings oldtimers. In between the 2nd and 3rd period of a game, he went outside to smoke a cigarette and, while smoking, he had a severe heart attack and died.

Career statistics

Regular season and playoffs

External links
 

1922 births
1972 deaths
Canadian expatriate ice hockey players in the United States
Canadian ice hockey centres
Chicago Blackhawks players
Detroit Red Wings players
Ice hockey people from Ontario
Kansas City Americans players
Kansas City Pla-Mors players
Ontario Hockey Association Senior A League (1890–1979) players
Owen Sound Greys players
Sportspeople from Stratford, Ontario
Stanley Cup champions